Esmundo Rodriguez (born May 25, 1977) is a former American soccer player.

External links
 
 soccerstats.us
 

1977 births
Living people
American soccer players
New Mexico Lobos men's soccer players
San Jose Earthquakes players
Seattle Sounders (1994–2008) players
MLS Pro-40 players
FC Dallas players
El Paso Patriots players
Association football forwards
Soccer players from Illinois
Major League Soccer players
A-League (1995–2004) players
United States men's under-20 international soccer players